Rollright Halt railway station served the village of Great Rollright in Oxfordshire, England.

History 

The station was built by the Great Western Railway. Local residents had campaigned for a station to serve Great Rollright since 1875. When Britain's railways were nationalised in 1948 the B&CDR became part of the Western Region of British Railways. In 1951 British Railways withdrew passenger services from the line through Rollright Halt. In 1962 BR closed the railway to freight traffic and some time thereafter the line was dismantled.

Rollright Siding
On 1 January 1909 a goods siding was opened 200 yards east of the passenger halt. A small platform and corrugated iron goods shed were provided. Incoming traffic was mostly coal for the local merchant James Taplin and also for Nash's of Long Compton. Outgoing traffic included pheasants and sugar beet. In April 1958 the line was blocked by a landslide between Rollright and Hook Norton, after this the siding was served from Chipping Norton only until closure in 1962. The final train ran on 30 November 1962 when BR standard class 2 number 78001 removed the remaining wagons from the siding. Official closure came a few days later on 3 December 1962.

Route

Notes

References

 
 
 

Disused railway stations in Oxfordshire
Former Great Western Railway stations
Railway stations in Great Britain opened in 1906
Railway stations in Great Britain closed in 1951